{{Album ratings
| rev1      = AllMusic
| rev1score = 
| rev2 = Christgau's Consumer Guide
| rev2score = 
|noprose = yes 
| rev3 = The Great Rock Discography
| rev3score = 7/10<ref name="GRD"></ref>
| rev4 = The Penguin Guide to Blues Recordings| rev4score  = 
}}The Sky Is Crying is the fifth and final studio album by Stevie Ray Vaughan and Double Trouble, compiling songs recorded throughout most of their career. Released 14 months after Vaughan's death in 1990, the album features ten previously unreleased tracks recorded between 1984 and 1989. Only one title, "Empty Arms" (complete reprisal), appeared on any of the group's previous albums. The tracks were compiled by Vaughan's brother, Jimmie Vaughan, and was Vaughan's highest charting album at number 10.

The album received mostly positive reviews. Critics praised the blues and jazz styles, and the solid track listing, but criticized the lack of original songs.The Sky Is Crying'' illustrates many of Vaughan's musical influences, including songs in the style of traditional Delta blues, Texas blues, Chicago blues, jump blues, jazz blues, and Jimi Hendrix's blues-rock.  The album's tone alternates primarily between uptempo pieces and gritty, slow blues. The album includes a Grammy-winning extended instrumental cover version of Jimi Hendrix's "Little Wing"; Kenny Burrell's "Chitlins con Carne", a jazz instrumental; and, "Life by the Drop", a song written by Vaughan's friend Doyle Bramhall and played on a twelve-string acoustic guitar.

Track listing
Album details are taken from the original 1991 Epic Records CD liner notes and may differ from other sources; track timings are from the AllMusic album review.
 "Boot Hill" (Unknown)  – 2:15
 "The Sky Is Crying" (Elmore James, Morris Levy, Clarence Lewis) – 4:38
 "Empty Arms" (Stevie Ray Vaughan) – 3:31
 "Little Wing" (instrumental) (Jimi Hendrix) – 6:50
 "Wham" (instrumental) (Lonnie Mack) – 2:27
 "May I Have a Talk with You" (Chester Burnett  Howlin' Wolf) – 5:50
 "Close to You" (Willie Dixon) – 3:13
 "Chitlins con Carne" (instrumental) (Kenny Burrell) – 3:59
 "So Excited" (instrumental) (Vaughan) – 3:32
 "Life by the Drop" (Doyle Bramhall, Barbara Logan) – 2:27

Personnel
Stevie Ray Vaughan and Double Trouble
Stevie Ray Vaughan – guitars, vocals
Chris Layton – drums
Tommy Shannon – bass guitar
Reese Wynans – keyboards

Production
Track 1 produced by Jim Gaines and Stevie Ray Vaughan and Double Trouble
Recorded at Kiva Studios, Memphis, Tennessee, 2/89–4/89
Engineered by Jim Gaines and Richard Mullen
Assistant engineers – Evan Rush, Danny Jones

Tracks 2, 6, 8, and 9 produced by Stevie Ray Vaughan and Double Trouble and Richard Mullen
Recorded at The Dallas Sound Lab, Dallas, Texas, 3/85–5/85
Engineered by Richard Mullen
Assistant engineer – Ron Cote

Tracks 3–5 and 7 produced by Stevie Ray Vaughan, Chris Layton, Tommy Shannon, Richard Mullen, and Jim Capfer
Recorded at The Power Station, New York City, 1/84–2/84
Engineered by Richard Mullen
Assistant engineer – Rob Eaton

Track 10 produced by Stevie Ray Vaughan and Jim Gaines
Recorded at Sound Castle Studios, Los Angeles, 4/89–5/89

Compilation and additional production – Jimmie Vaughan
Mixed and engineered by Richard Mullen
Assistant engineer – Jeff Powell
Production coordination – Mark Proct, Mark Rutledge, Roger Klein
Mastered by Bob Ludwig
Art direction – Arnold Levine/Mark Burdett
Photography – William Snyder
Inside photo – Stephanie Chernakowski
Band photo – Alan Messer

Charts

References

Stevie Ray Vaughan albums
Albums published posthumously
1991 albums
Epic Records albums
Grammy Award for Best Contemporary Blues Album